Larry Clark Robinson (born June 2, 1951) is a Canadian former ice hockey coach, executive and player. His coaching career includes head coaching positions with the New Jersey Devils (which he held on two occasions), as well as the Los Angeles Kings. For his play in the National Hockey League (NHL) with the Montreal Canadiens and Los Angeles Kings, Robinson was inducted into the Hockey Hall of Fame in 1995. He was also inducted into the Ontario Sports Hall of Fame in 2014. In 2017, Robinson was named one of the "100 Greatest NHL Players". Larry is the brother of Moe Robinson.

Playing career 
Larry Robinson played Junior 'A' hockey with the Brockville Braves of the CJHL and Major Junior in the Ontario Hockey League with the Kitchener Rangers then turned professional, spending 1971 to 1973 with the Nova Scotia Voyageurs of the American Hockey League before making it to the National Hockey League with the Montreal Canadiens.

Nicknamed "Big Bird" in part for his size (6'4’’ and 225 pounds), Robinson was a big and strong yet highly mobile defenceman. He played 17 seasons for the Montreal Canadiens and another three seasons for the Los Angeles Kings, until his retirement after the 1991–92 season. He won the James Norris Memorial Trophy twice (1976–77 and 1979–80) as the league's most outstanding defenceman and won the Conn Smythe Trophy as the most valuable player of the 1978 playoffs. He was named to the league's first and second all-star teams three times each.  His peak years were 1976–77 to 1980–81, although he had a strong comeback season at age 34 in 1985–86 when he was again named to the second all-star team and scored 82 points, just three shy of his career high of 85 (1976–77). Robinson was a dominant player whose talent and leadership helped lead the Canadiens to six Stanley Cups.

Robinson was a member of Team Canada in the 1976, 1981 and 1984 Canada Cup tournaments and was an international All-Star team selection in the 1981 IIHF World Championships. During his career, he played in ten of the league's All-Star games and ended his 20-year career having scored 208 goals, 750 assists and 958 regular-season points as well as 144 points in 227 playoff games, a remarkable achievement for a defenceman. He holds an impressive career plus-minus rating of +730, the NHL career record, including an overwhelming +120 in 1976–77 (second only to Bobby Orr's record +124 in 1970–71, and with Orr and Wayne Gretzky (+100 1984–85), is one of only three players to have a plus-minus rating of +100 or greater for a season). He won the Stanley Cup six times with the Canadiens, in 1973, 1976, 1977, 1978, 1979, and 1986. Together with Nicklas Lidstrom, Robinson holds the NHL record for most consecutive playoff seasons with 20, 17 of them with the Canadiens.

Robinson has been honoured for his playing career. In 1995, he was inducted into the Hockey Hall of Fame. In 1998, he was ranked number 24 on The Hockey News' list of the 100 Greatest Hockey Players. In 2000, he was inducted into the Ottawa Sports Hall of Fame. On November 19, 2007, the Canadiens retired Robinson's No. 19 jersey before a loss against the Ottawa Senators. Larry Robinson's name appears on the Stanley Cup ten times, six as a player, three as a coach or assistant coach and once as a scout.

Coaching career 
Following his retirement, Robinson was hired as an assistant coach with the New Jersey Devils in 1993. After winning the Stanley Cup in 1995 with the Devils, he was hired as head coach of the Los Angeles Kings, the same year he was inducted into the Hockey Hall of Fame. He left the Los Angeles team at the end of the 1998–99 season and signed on as an assistant coach with the New Jersey Devils once again. Named interim head coach of the New Jersey Devils on March 23, 2000, Robinson guided his team to win the 2000 Stanley Cup. With the victory, Robinson became the first interim head coach in NHL history to guide a team to the Stanley Cup. The feat would later be accomplished by Craig Berube in 2019. Robinson recounted to journalist Scott Morrison: 

He stayed on as head coach for the next year and again guided the Devils to the Stanley Cup finals, where they lost against the Colorado Avalanche in seven games.

Robinson was fired during the 2001–02 season, but returned as an assistant coach just before the 2002–03 season to win his ninth Stanley Cup in 2003.

When Pat Burns suffered a recurrence of cancer, Robinson again assumed the mantle of head coach on July 14, 2005. This stint came to an end on December 19, 2005, when Robinson resigned, citing stress and other health problems.

Robinson returned to the Devils prior to the 2007–08 season as an assistant coach under Brent Sutter. Prior to the 2008–09 season, Robinson left from behind the Devils' bench to become a special assignment coach between the organization's prospects in Lowell, Mass., and the Devils.

Robinson's contract ended with the New Jersey Devils in the summer of 2012. He indicated he was interested in becoming an assistant coach with the Montreal Canadiens, however that post was filled with former Hab J.J. Daigneault soon after. Robinson then was appointed an associate coach with the San Jose Sharks on July 10, 2012. On May 23, 2014, the Sharks added director of player development to Robinson's role. In 2017, at the end of his five-year contract with the Sharks, Robinson left the organization. He is currently a Senior Consultant to Hockey Operations for the St. Louis Blues.

With the St. Louis Blues defeating the Boston Bruins in the 2019 Stanley Cup Finals, Robinson won his tenth Stanley Cup championship.

Polo and horse racing 
Robinson was raised on a Marvelville, Ontario farm and as a boy, he grew up with a love of horses.  While living in the rural area of Saint-Lazare, Quebec west of Montreal, Robinson became a co-founder with former teammate Steve Shutt, Michael Sinclair-Smith and local veterinarian Dr. Gilbert Hallé of the Montreal Polo Club at Sainte-Marthe, Quebec.

While playing in Los Angeles, Robinson became involved in the sport of thoroughbred horse racing through a partnership with Kings owner Bruce McNall's Summa Stable. Among their racing successes, Down Again won the 1990 Monrovia Handicap at Santa Anita Park.

Career statistics

Regular season and playoffs

* Stanley Cup Champion.

International

Coaching career statistics

See also
Notable families in the NHL

References

External links

1951 births
Living people
Canadian ice hockey defencemen
Canadian people of Scottish descent
Canadian polo players
Canadian racehorse owners and breeders
Conn Smythe Trophy winners
Hockey Hall of Fame inductees
Ice hockey people from Ottawa
James Norris Memorial Trophy winners
Kitchener Rangers players
Los Angeles Kings coaches
Los Angeles Kings players
Montreal Canadiens draft picks
Montreal Canadiens players
National Hockey League All-Stars
National Hockey League players with retired numbers
New Jersey Devils coaches
People from the United Counties of Stormont, Dundas and Glengarry
Nova Scotia Voyageurs players
San Jose Sharks coaches
Stanley Cup champions
Stanley Cup championship-winning head coaches
Canadian ice hockey coaches